Maninderjit Singh Magmar (born 17 November 1972) is a Malaysian field hockey player. He competed at the 1996 Summer Olympics and the 2000 Summer Olympics.

References

External links
 

1972 births
Living people
Malaysian male field hockey players
Malaysian people of Punjabi descent
Malaysian sportspeople of Indian descent
Olympic field hockey players of Malaysia
Field hockey players at the 1996 Summer Olympics
Field hockey players at the 2000 Summer Olympics
Place of birth missing (living people)
Commonwealth Games medallists in field hockey
Commonwealth Games silver medallists for Malaysia
Field hockey players at the 1998 Commonwealth Games
Medallists at the 1998 Commonwealth Games